Bhumaka (Kharosthi:  , ; Brahmi:  , ; ?–119 CE) was a Western Kshatrapa ruler of the early 2nd century CE.
He was the father of the great ruler Nahapana, according to one of the latter's coins. He was preceded by Abhiraka (Aubhirakes), of whom a few coins are known.

His coins bear Buddhist symbols, such as the eight-spoked wheel (dharmachakra), or the lion seated on a capital, a representation of a pillar of Ashoka.

Bhumaka's coins have been found in the regions of Gujarat, Kathiawad and Malwa.

Notes

Western Satraps
2nd-century Indian monarchs